Blink Bonnie may refer to:

Blink Bonnie (Schodack, New York), listed on the National Register of Historic Places in Rensselaer County, New York
Blink Bonnie (Ridgeway, South Carolina), listed on the National Register of Historic Places in Fairfield County, South Carolina